Alexander Valeryevich Dryagin (born 18 November 1990) is a Russian sport shooter.

He participated at the 2018 ISSF World Shooting Championships.

References

External links

Living people
1990 births
Russian male sport shooters
ISSF rifle shooters
People from Kushva
Sportspeople from Sverdlovsk Oblast